KRQR (106.7 FM) is a commercial radio station located in Orland, California, broadcasting to the entire Sacramento Valley.  KRQR airs an active rock music format branded as "Z-Rock", adopting the branding and imaging formerly used by the satellite radio network of the same name.

The call letters were previously used by frequency 97.3 FM in San Francisco from 1982 to 1995.

External links
Official Website

RQR
Active rock radio stations in the United States
Radio stations established in 1994
1994 establishments in California